A considerable number of the fibers of the thyroarytenoid muscle are prolonged into the aryepiglottic fold, where some of them become lost, while others continue to the margin of the epiglottis. They have received a distinctive name, thyroepiglotticus or thyroepiglottic muscle, and are sometimes described as a separate muscle. This muscle's function is to widen the laryngeal inlet.

References

External links
 https://archive.today/20121212034835/http://accweb.itr.maryville.edu/myu/Bio301Summer/301on9.html

Muscles of the head and neck